Lower Pergase or Pergase Hypenerthen was a deme in ancient Attica of the phyle of Erechtheis.

Its site is located near modern Chelidonou.

References

Populated places in ancient Attica
Former populated places in Greece
Demoi